Celebration Church is a global, multi-site church located in Jacksonville, Florida. It is a member of the Association of Related Churches. and is led by Senior Pastors Tim and Jen Timberlake. 

The Church is based in Jacksonville, Florida with other regional and international locations.

Celebration Arena 
In August 2011, a ceremony was held for its new location, a 7,000 square foot facility on 30 acres near 9A and Baymeadows Road. For the First Phase, the $15 million building project features a 3,000 seat capacity in an arena-style sanctuary, with broadcasting and audio visual capabilities. The second phase of the project will include a 1,000-seat youth facility, church offices, adult classrooms and a wedding chapel. The first services in the new "Celebration Arena" was held November 11, 2012.

Financial Information
	
In 2018, Celebration Church's total revenue for the year was valued at a reported $13,639,193 by the ECFA, and their total assets were valued at a reported $44,213,694.

See also
 List of the largest Protestant churches in the USA
 Non-denominational Christianity

References

External links
Celebration.org
Stovall's Blog
Celebration Church Extension Gatherings
Celebration Church Online, an internet extension of Celebration Church

Evangelical megachurches in the United States
Megachurches in Florida
Non-denominational Evangelical churches
Churches in Jacksonville, Florida
1998 establishments in Florida